Instructing The Heart is a 2003 Italian romantic comedy film. It marked the directorial debut by Giovanni Morricone, son of composer Ennio and brother of composer Andrea, who both co-scored the film.

Cast 

Claudia Gerini: Lorenza
Pierfrancesco Favino: Riccardo
Sabrina Impacciatore: Paola
Pierre Cosso: Giulio
Giovanni Esposito: Gaetano
Francesca Antonelli: Chiara 
Valentina Carnelutti: Silvietta
Patrizia Sacchi: Elisa

References

External links

2003 films
Italian romantic comedy films
2003 romantic comedy films
Films scored by Ennio Morricone
2003 directorial debut films
2000s Italian films